Kurt Heuser (23 November 1903 – 20 June 1975) was a German screenwriter.

Early in his career he wrote Schlußakkord (Final Accord or better Final Chord), a German film melodrama of the Nazi period.

Selected filmography
 Love, Death and the Devil (1934)
 One Too Many on Board (1935)
 Schlußakkord (1936)
 A Strange Guest (1936)
 Condottieri (1937)
 To New Shores (1937)
 Red Orchids (1938)
 Liberated Hands (1939)
 Midsummer Night's Fire (1939)
 The Three Codonas (1940)
 The Girl from Fano (1941)
 Rembrandt (1942)
 Paracelsus (1943)
 The Trial (1948)
 Maresi (1948)
 Bonus on Death (1950)
 Call Over the Air (1951)
 The Sergeant's Daughter (1952)
 The Great Temptation (1952)
 Alraune (1952)
 A Life for Do (1954)
 André and Ursula (1955)
 Before God and Man (1955)
 I Was All His (1958)
 The Forests Sing Forever (1959)
 Every Day Isn't Sunday (1959)
 Carnival Confession (1960)
 Girl from Hong Kong (1961)
 Our House in Cameroon (1961)
 Via Mala (1961)
 The Gentlemen (1965)

References

Bibliography 
 Rentschler, Eric. The Ministry of Illusion: Nazi Cinema and Its Afterlife. Harvard University Press, 1996.

External links 
 

1903 births
1975 deaths
German male screenwriters
Mass media people from Strasbourg
20th-century German screenwriters